The 2000 Australian Formula Ford Championship was open to drivers of racing cars complying with CAMS Formula Ford regulations. The title was contested over an eight round series, with two races per round.

Calendar
Round 1, Phillip Island Grand Prix Circuit, Victoria, 13 February
Round 2, Barbagallo Raceway, Western Australia, 19 March
Round 3, Eastern Creek Raceway, New South Wales, 30 April
Round 4, Phillip Island Grand Prix Circuit, Victoria, 7 May
Round 5, Queensland Raceway, Ipswich, Queensland, 2 July
Round 6, Oran Park Raceway, New South Wales, 30 July
Round 7, Calder Park Raceway, Victoria, 20 August
Round 8, Mallala Motor Sport Park, South Australia, 27 August

Points were awarded to the top ten placegetters in each of the sixteen races on a  20, 16, 14, 12, 10, 8, 6, 4, 2, 1  basis.

Results

References

External links
CAMS Manual of Motor Sport, 2000 Edition
www.camsmanual.com.au
www.formulaford.com.au
www.natsoft.com.au
www.racetime.com.au
Race Program, Mallala Motor Sport Park, 25-27/8/2000

Australian Formula Ford Championship seasons
Formula Ford